Garra longipinnis is a cyprinid fish only found in Oman. It is unclear whether this is a different species from Garra barreimiae. No specimens have been found since 1968, and its taxonomic and conservation status could not be confirmed.

Sources

Garra
Fish described in 1977
Taxonomy articles created by Polbot